Weberbauerocereus weberbaueri is a species of Weberbauerocereus from Peru.

References

External links
 
 

weberbaueri
Flora of Peru
Plants described in 1958